Meguid, extended form Abdel Meguid, is an Egyptian surname.

Notable people with this surname include:
 Abdel Meguid Amir (born 1961), Egyptian basketball player
 Abdel Meguid Mahmoud (born 1946), Egyptian politician
 Ahmed Abdel-Meguid, (1923-2013), Egyptian diplomat
 Ibrahim Abdel Meguid, Egyptian author
 Michael M. Meguid, Egyptian-American surgeon
 Nagwa Abdel Meguid, Egyptian geneticist
 Omar Abdel Meguid (born 1988), Egyptian squash player
 Wahid Abdel Meguid, Egyptian politician